The economy of Wiltshire in South West England was worth £16.392 billion to the UK economy in 2013.

Overview 
The Wiltshire economy benefits from the "M4 corridor effect", which attracts business, and the attractiveness of its countryside, towns and villages. The northern part of the county is richer than the southern part, particularly since Swindon is home to national and international corporations such as Honda, Intel, Motorola, Patheon, Catalent (formerly known as Cardinal Health), Becton-Dickinson, WHSmith, Early Learning Centre and Nationwide, with Dyson located in nearby Malmesbury. Wiltshire's employment structure is distinctive in having a significantly higher number of people in various forms of manufacturing (especially electrical equipment and apparatus, food products, and beverages, furniture, rubber, pharmaceuticals, and plastic goods) than the national average.

In addition, there is higher-than-average employment in public administration and defence, due to the military establishments around the county, particularly around Amesbury and Corsham. There are sizeable British Army barracks at Tidworth, Bulford and Warminster, and the Royal School of Artillery is at Larkhill. Further north, RAF Lyneham was home to the RAF's Hercules C130 fleet until 2011; the MoD Lyneham site is now a centre for Army technical training. Wiltshire is also distinctive for the high proportion of its working-age population who are economically active (86.6% in 1999–2000) and its low unemployment rates. The gross domestic product (GDP) level in Wiltshire did not reach the UK average in 1998, and was only marginally above the rate for South West England.

History 
A largely rural county, agriculture has historically dominated the economy.

Manufacturing 
Avon Protection, formerly Avon Rubber, makes personal protection equipment for defence and industry near Melksham; the company's Avon Tyres business at Melksham was sold to Cooper Tire & Rubber in 1993. Until the late 20th century, rubber parts for railways and other industries were also made nearby at Bradford-on-Avon. The engineer Alex Moulton specialised in rubber suspension systems, and a factory at Bradford-on-Avon still makes small-wheel bicycles under the Moulton brand.

An Arla creamery at Westbury makes Anchor butter. Nearby, Welton Bibby & Baron claim to be the UK's largest manufacturer of paper bags and similar goods.

The Honda car plant near Swindon closed in July 2021 after 36 years. 3,000 jobs were lost.

Tourism 

The World Heritage Site of Stonehenge is on Salisbury Plain in southern Wiltshire. The site is considered a British cultural icon and attracts many New Age travellers.

References

See also 

 List of ceremonial counties in England by gross value added

Economy of Wiltshire